Plazma  (previously known as Slow Motion) is a Russian musical group consisting of Roman Chernitsyn (vocals, lyrics, music) and Maxim Postelniy (background vocals, keyboards, music and arrangements). The band was one of the first Russian pop groups to produce its songs exclusively in English for a Russian-speaking audience.

The third album, was released in 2006. In December 2017, Plazma released their fourth studio album — .

Albums
As Slow Motion
 1991: Falling in Love
 1999: Prologue

As Plazma
 2000: 
 2002: 
 2006: 
 2017:

Singles
 2000: Take My Love
 2000: Jump in My Car
 2000: The Sweetest Surrender
 2001: Fading like a Rose
 2001: Lonely
 2002: You'll Never Meet an Angel
 2003: You Know (My Recent Disease) 
 2003: A Bit of Perfection
 2003: The Power of Your Spell
 2004: Never Again
 2004: Lonely II
 2005: One of a Kind
 2005: One Life
 2006: Save
 2006: Black Would Be White
 2007: I Never Dreamed (That You’d Love Me)
 2008: Living in the Past
 2009: Never Ending Story
 2009: The Real Song
 2010: Mystery (The Power Within)
 2011: Angel of Snow
 2013: Black Leather Boys
 2014: Lucky Rider
 2015: Tame Your Ghosts
 2017: Later (promo single)
 2017: Dangerous (promo single)
 2017: Indian Summer (promo single)
 2017: Up In the Wind (promo single)
 2017: Brilliant Water (promo single)
 2018: Rescue Me (feat. Mish)
 2019: I Believe in Love
 2019: Salvation
 2020: Freedom Is Finally Mine

Videos
 The music video was filmed in October 1990 and had its first television premiere in 1991 in Volgograd, Russia. But on the Internet it was officially premiered only 29 years later, on 26 June 2020 on the Slow Motion and Plazma official pages at VKontakte:  Hungry for Love (as Slow Motion)
 2000:  Take My Love
 2000:  The Sweetest Surrender
 2001:  Lonely
 2002:  You'll Never Meet an Angel
 2003:  A Bit of Perfection
 2004:  Lonely II
 2005:  One Life
 2010:  Mystery (The Power Within)
 2016:  Tame Your Ghosts
 2019:  I Believe in Love

References

External links
 Official page at iTunes Store
 Official page at Google Play
 Official site 
 Official channel at Instagram
 Official page at VKontakte
 Official page at Facebook
 Official channel at YouTube
 Official page at Last.fm

Russian pop music groups